The Camp Crowder Gymnasium is a historic school building at 205 Shiloh Drive in Sulphur Springs, Benton County, Arkansas.  It is a tall single-story wood-frame structure, covered in weatherboard, with normal-height single-story shed-roofed sections running the length of the building.  It was built in the early 1940s at Camp Crowder, a military base in Missouri, and moved to this location in 1948 by the Brown Military Academy of the Ozarks.  The complex which it is a part of has gone through a variety of institutional ownership changes, with the building continuing to serve as a focus of recreational activities.  It is a rare example of military construction in the small community.

The building was listed on the National Register of Historic Places in 2011.

See also
National Register of Historic Places listings in Benton County, Arkansas

References

School buildings on the National Register of Historic Places in Arkansas
National Register of Historic Places in Benton County, Arkansas
1948 establishments in Arkansas
School buildings completed in the 1940s
1940s establishments in Missouri
Military facilities on the National Register of Historic Places in Arkansas
Relocated buildings and structures in Arkansas
Education in Benton County, Arkansas
Gyms in the United States
World War II on the National Register of Historic Places